"River Daniel" Blue House, also known as Highlanders Farm, is a historic home located near Carthage, Moore County, North Carolina. It was built about 1795, and is a two-story, gable-roof log house sheathed in weatherboard.  The house has two gable-end single, stepped-shoulder brick chimneys.  Also on the property are the contributing "old kitchen," one-room log structure, and rail depot.

It was added to the National Register of Historic Places in 1983.

References

Log houses in the United States
Houses on the National Register of Historic Places in North Carolina
Houses completed in 1795
Houses in Moore County, North Carolina
National Register of Historic Places in Moore County, North Carolina
Log buildings and structures on the National Register of Historic Places in North Carolina